Gigi Ion (born 15 September 1967), also known as Ion Gigi, is a Romanian former professional footballer and manager. Ion played as a defender or midfielder and mostly for Oțelul Galați, but he also played for other teams as: Universitatea Cluj, Ceahlăul Piatra Neamț, Dacia Unirea Brăila and German side Sandhausen. Gigi Ion is considered a symbol of Oțelul, being introduced in 2014 by the Dunărea Bătrâna publication in the top 50 symbols of the club from Galați. Ion always shown his attachment for Oțelul and even refused an important offer from FC Steaua București, years later he stated: I wanted to play for Oțelul, not anywhere else. It really matters for me to feel something for the team I play, in this way I was raised. Despite its loyalty, he is considered one of the most unlucky footballers, in his career Gigi suffered two double tibia and fibula fractures, first in 1987 after which he, with much sacrifice spirit, returned to the pitch, having a metal rod in his leg and the second one in 2000, injury that ended his career. After retirement Gigi Ion worked for 5 years as a manager, later becoming a sports teacher.

Honours
Oțelul Galați
Divizia B: 1985–86, 1990–91
Universitatea Cluj
Divizia B: 1991–92
Ceahlăul Piatra Neamț
Divizia B: 1992–93
Sandhausen
Oberliga Baden-Württemberg: 1999–2000

Notes

References

External links
 

1967 births
Living people
Sportspeople from Galați
Romanian footballers
Association football defenders
Association football midfielders
Liga I players
Liga II players
ASC Oțelul Galați players
FC Universitatea Cluj players
CSM Ceahlăul Piatra Neamț players
AFC Dacia Unirea Brăila players
Regionalliga players
SV Sandhausen players
Romanian expatriate footballers
Romanian expatriate sportspeople in Germany
Expatriate footballers in Germany
Romanian football managers
ASC Oțelul Galați managers
FC Vaslui managers
AFC Dacia Unirea Brăila managers